Hell-Bent Fer Heaven is a melodrama play by Hatcher Hughes.

Production
The play ran at the Klaw Theatre from January 4  to April 1924 and was produced by Marc Klaw. The cast featured George Abbott, Glenn Anders and Margaret Borough. The play was staged by Augustin Duncan.

It also helped launch the career of Clara Blandick, who later appeared as Auntie Em in the classic 1939 adaptation of The Wizard of Oz.

The play was included in Burns Mantle's The Best Plays of 1923-1924.

Pulitzer Prize
The play won the Pulitzer Prize for Drama in 1924. The choice sparked controversy in literary circles and the media because the prize jury had actually selected George Kelly's The Show-Off, but was overruled by Columbia University, which was administering that year's Pulitzers as Hatcher Hughes was a professor there.

Plot
Set in the Blue Ridge Mountains of Kentucky, late one afternoon to 9 o'clock that evening during the summer. Rufe Pryor is a religious fanatic who works for the Hunts. Sid Hunt returns to the family home from the war. He has a girlfriend, Jude Lowry, who Rufe also is interested in.  Rufe inspires old clan rivalry between the Hunts and the Lowrys, in an attempt to remove Sid from the picture. When Rufe's plans are discovered, the two families reconcile. (The play was billed as "A High Spirited Tale of the Blue Ridge.")

Cast
 George Abbott as Sid Hunt
 Clara Blandick as Meg Hunt
 Augustin Duncan as David Hunt
 Burke Clarke as Matt Hunt
 Glenn Anders as Andy Lowry
 Margaret Borough as Jude Lowry
 John F. Hamilton as Rufe Pryor

Film
The play was made into the motion picture Hell-Bent for Heaven in 1926.

References

External links

The full text of Hell-Bent Fer Heaven at the Internet Archive
Hell-bent Fer Heaven at the Internet Broadway Database
Hell-Bent for Heaven at the Internet Movie Database
"Hell-bent Fer Heaven" Museum of the City of New York

1924 plays
American plays adapted into films
Pulitzer Prize for Drama-winning works